Ivan Ćirka (Serbian Cyrillic: Иван Ћирка; born 3 July 1977) is a Serbian footballer who plays for Dinamo Pančevo in the Serbian League Vojvodina.

Ćirka started his playing career with Dinamo Pančevo, before moving to Hajduk Kula in the 2002 winter transfer window. He spent the following six years there, making near 130 league appearances for the club in the top flight.

Career statistics

External links
 

1977 births
Living people
Sportspeople from Pančevo
Serbian footballers
Association football defenders
FK Dinamo Pančevo players
FK Hajduk Kula players
OFK Beograd players
FK Mladost Apatin players
FK Slavija Sarajevo players
FK Novi Pazar players
FK BASK players
Serbian SuperLiga players
Serbian expatriate footballers
Expatriate footballers in Bosnia and Herzegovina